Sir Philip Carteret, FRS (1641 – 1672), was the eldest son of Sir George Carteret and his wife and cousin Elizabeth de Cartetet.

Philip was elected Fellow of the Royal Society on 15 February 1665.

He married Jemima Montagu, daughter of Edward Montagu, 1st Earl of Sandwich and Jemima Crewe, in an arranged marriage on 31 July 1665. Samuel Pepys had a hand in the marriage and wrote of it at some length in his diary. Jemima and Samuel were grandchildren of John Pepys of Cottenham and Elizabeth Bendish. Jemima had only known of Philip some fourteen days before their marriage: Pepys did ask her if she could like Philip as a husband, and was relieved when she answered that she thought she could like him very well. Samuel noted that Jemima failed to arrive in time for the ceremony at the church. The marriage is thought to have been reasonably happy. Jemima died in childbirth in 1671. 

Philip was father of four children, including George Carteret, 1st Baron Carteret. 

Knighted in 1667, he became Gentleman of the King's Chamber in 1670.

Philip died along with his father-in-law the Earl of Sandwich when their ship, the Prince Royal, was grappled by a Dutch fire ship in the Battle of Solebay.

External links
decarteret.org.uk Person Sheet

Philip Carteret FRS
Fellows of the Royal Society
1672 deaths
1641 births
Lords Proprietors of Carolina
Heirs apparent who never acceded